Emperor's Box is a studio album credited to Australian musician, Katie Noonan and the Captains. It was released in April 2010 and peaked at number 21 on the Australian ARIA Charts.

Speaking about the album, Noonan said; "Blackbird was definitely a musical departure for me [but] This new album is more my true path. My main motivation has always been to create an original sound and an original concept, and this really sounds like me." She added, "It's the best thing I've ever done, music is about freedom for me, I've always followed my muse and been very lucky to be able go on and make different records. This is definitely the album I’m most proud of." This was Noonan's last album with Sony Music Australia. "Page One" was released as the lead single on 19 February 2010.

Reviews
Bernard Zuel from Sydney Morning Herald gave the album 3 out of 5 saying, "Noonan returns in some ways to where we first encountered her in George, in so far as several songs begin from pop-rock roots and a forceful backbeat and then pile on strings or electronics or vaulting vocalising (and sometimes all three) as they take left turns." adding "That's a lot of ideas on one record, which is as admirable as Noonan's refusal to play safe."

Jenny Meagher from the Music Feeds said; "The pleasant thing about Katie’s compositions is that they are all interesting and substantially individualistic. You never feel like you’ve hit the repeat button from a previous track. She can play it soft like a coo, or loud like an opera singer depending on the intention of the track. I advise if you are a fan of her already, then this won’t disappoint, just be prepared for the mixed bag of music that will bellow out of your headphones."

Track listing
 "Radar" (Adam Reily, Andy Stochansky, Cameron Deyell, Declan Kelly, Stuart Hunter, Katie Noonan) - 4:41
 "Half in Water" (Stuart Hunter, Thomas Shapcott, Katie Noonan) - 3:37
 "Page One" (Cameron Deyell, Don Walker, Katie Noonan) - 4:48
 "Emperor's Box" (Katie Noonan)- 4:22
 "Sweet One"  (featuring Sia)  (Lester Mendez, Sia Furler, Katie Noonan) - 4:08
 "Time" (Katie Noonan) - 4:55
 "I Had a Drink Today" (Cameron Deyell, Don Walker, Katie Noonan)- 2:25
 "After The Rain" (Blair Mackichan, Stuart Crichton, Katie Noonan) - 4:21
 "Never Know Your Luck" (Tim Finn, Katie Noonan)- 3:50
 "Golden" (Katie Noonan)- 4:38
 "Space Between" (Andrew Guirguis, Katie Noonan) - 3:00
 "Cotton Wool" (Josh Pyke, Katie Noonan)- 4:21
 "Little Boys" (Cameron Deyell, Thomas Shapcott, Katie Noonan)- 3:54

Weekly charts

Release history

Credits
 Arranged By [Horns]/ [Strings] – Katie Noonan, Steve Newcomb
 Backing Vocals – Josh Pyke
 Bass – Stu Hunter
 Bass Guitar – Phil Stack 
 Drums – Declan Kelly 
 Guitar – Cameron Deyell
 Keyboards – Katie Noonan, Stu Hunter
 Noises – Stu Hunter 
 Percussion – Declan Kelly

References

External links
 "Emperor's Box" by Katie Noonan and Captains at Discogs

2010 albums
Katie Noonan albums
Sony Music Australia albums